Johann Rudolf Graf Czernin von und zu Chudenitz (born or baptized on 9 June 1757 in Vienna; died or buried on 23 April 1845 in Vienna) was a k. k. Austrian civil servant and theater director. He descended from the old Bohemian noble family Czernin von und zu Chudenitz. He was the son of Count Prokop Adalbert Czernin, who offered Mozart in 1776 a one year's rent, provided he would write some compositions for the Count's orchestra. His sister was Countess Antonie Lützow. His mother was the sister of Archbishop Colloredo, thus the Count was a nephew of the Salzburg Archbishop.

Life
Czernin went to school in Salzburg, where his uncle, Count Hieronymus von Colloredo, was the bishop. The young Czernin and certainly his sister were in connection with Wolfgang Amadeus Mozart (and almost the same age), who wrote a violin and piano concerto for them. Countess Lützow, 25 years old, was a fine pianist and Mozart composed a piano concerto (K. 246) for her in 1776. Count Johann Rudolph Czernin was an aspiring violinist. In 1778 he founded an orchestra, which played on Sunday afternoons at the Lodron family. Leopold Mozart sent Wolfgang, then in Paris, an amusing account of its first meeting, at which both Leopold and Mozart's sister, Nannerl, played. Leopold wrote of Czernin's limited achievements as an indefatigable violin player.

In 1781 Czernin married Theresa Schönborn and traveled with her to Italy, Switzerland, France, Belgium, Holland, and England, and became interested in the new fashion of the English landscape garden. At the end of the 18th century, Czernin made the hunting lodge Jemčina very famous. In the presence of representatives of the Bohemian and Austrian aristocracy famous Cursorial hunting parties were held here, and scholars and scientists from the Bohemian National Patriotic Movement were invited as guests.

In 1810 Johann Wolfgang von Goethe was invited to Krásný Dvůr Castle, the family estates, near Karlsbad. In the meantime, Czernin began to accumulate paintings and drawings, and had twenty years later, the most important collection of the Austrian Empire. In 1813 he bought The Art of Painting, a genre work by Johannes Vermeer. From 1817 until 1825 František Tkadlík was the court painter for the Czernin family and appointed as the guard of their art gallery in Vienna.

In 1823 Czernin was appointed president of the Academy of Fine Arts in Vienna. This office he held until 1827. As early as 1823, he was appointed by the Emperor Francis II. He was entrusted with the leadership of the imperial collections of the Court; the old Burgtheater was also under his direction. He also founded the Society of the Patriotic Museums.

Johann Rudolf Czernin, Count von und zu Chudenitz died at the age of 88. His private art collection at his death consisted of nearly 2,000 engravings, which laid the foundation of the Czernin Collection. Parts of this collection can still be seen in the Residenzgalerie in Salzburg.

Notes

Wolfgang Amadeus Mozart
Bohemian nobility
Johann Rudolf
1757 births
1845 deaths
Austrian civil servants
Austrian theatre directors
Austrian art collectors
Court painters
Academic staff of the Academy of Fine Arts Vienna
Knights of the Golden Fleece of Austria